"I Was Made for Loving You" is a song by American singer Tori Kelly from her debut studio album, Unbreakable Smile (2015) through Capitol Records. It was written by Kelly and Ed Sheeran.

Commercially, the song reached number 10 on the Billboard Bubbling Under Hot 100 chart.

Charts

Certifications

References

2015 songs
Tori Kelly songs
Ed Sheeran songs
Songs written by Tori Kelly
Songs written by Ed Sheeran